Shamsabad or Shemsabad may refer to:

Azerbaijan
 Şəmsabad

India
 Shamsabad, Agra
 Shamsabad, Farrukhabad
 Shamshabad, Telangana

Iran

Ardabil Province
 Shamsabad, Khalkhal, a village in Khalkhal County
 Shamsabad, Meshgin Shahr, a village in Meshgin Shahr County
 Shamsabad, Nir, a village in Nir County
 Shamsabad, Sareyn, a village in Sareyn County

Chaharmahal and Bakhtiari Province
 Shamsabad, Chaharmahal and Bakhtiari, a village in Shahrekord County

Fars Province
 Shamsabad, Bakhtajerd, a village in Darab County
 Shamsabad, Paskhan, a village in Darab County
 Shamsabad, Estahban, a village in Estahban County
 Shamsabad-e Borzu, a village in Marvdasht County
 Shamsabad-e Chahar Taq, a village in Marvdasht County
 Shamsabad-e Takht, a village in Marvdasht County
 Shamsabad, Sepidan, a village in Sepidan County
 Shamsabad-e Qareh Gozlu, a village in Sepidan County

Golestan Province
 Shamsabad, Golestan, a village in Gorgan County, Golestan Province

Hamadan Province
 Shamsabad, Hamadan, a village in Hamadan County, Hamadan Province

Isfahan Province
 Shamsabad, Ardestan, a village in Ardestan County
 Shamsabad, Isfahan, a village in Isfahan County

Kerman Province
 Shamsabad, Anbarabad, a village in Anbarabad County
 Shamsabad, Arzuiyeh, a village in Arzuiyeh County
 Shamsabad-e Olya, a village in Bam County
 Shamsabad-e Chahdegal, a village in Fahraj County
 Shamsabad, Kerman, a village in Kerman County
 Shamsabad, Qaleh Ganj, a village in Qaleh Ganj County
 Shamsabad, Sorkh Qaleh, a village in Qaleh Ganj County
 Shamsabad, Rafsanjan, a village in Rafsanjan County
 Shamsabad, Sirjan, a village in Sirjan County

Kermanshah Province
 Shamsabad, Kermanshah, a village in Harsin County

Khuzestan Province
 Shamsabad, Bagh-e Malek, a village in Bagh-e Malek County
 Shamsabad, Dezful, a village in Dezful County
 Shamsabad Rural District (Khuzestan Province)
 Shamsabad, Masjed Soleyman, a village in Masjed Soleyman County
 Shamsabad, Golgir, a village in Masjed Soleyman County

Kohgiluyeh and Boyer-Ahmad Province
 Shamsabad, Kohgiluyeh and Boyer-Ahmad, a village in Charam County

Lorestan Province
 Shamsabad, Lorestan

Markazi Province
 Shamsabad, Amiriyeh, a village in Arak County
 Shamsabad, Davudabad, a village in Arak County
 Shamsabad, Shamsabad, a village in Arak County
 Shamsabad, Khomeyn, a village in Khomeyn County
 Shamsabad Rural District (Markazi Province)

Mazandaran Province
 Shamsabad, Amol, a village in Amol County
 Shamsabad, Tonekabon, a village in Tonekabon County

Qom Province
 Shamsabad, Qom

Razavi Khorasan Province
 Shamsabad, Bardaskan, a village in Bardaskan County
 Shamsabad (36°11′ N 58°38′ E), Firuzeh, a village in Firuzeh County
 Shamsabad, Jowayin, a village in Jowayin County
 Shamsabad, Khoshab, a village in Khoshab County
 Shamsabad, Mahvelat, a village in Mahvelat County
 Shamsabad, Mashhad, a village in Mashhad County
 Shamsabad, Mazul, a village in Nishapur County
 Shamsabad, Rivand, a village in Nishapur County
 Shamsabad, Sabzevar, a village in Sabzevar County

Semnan Province

Sistan and Baluchestan Province
 Shamsabad, Bampur, a village in Bampur County
 Shamsabad, Dalgan, a village in Dalgan County
 Shamsabad-e Sarhang, a village in Iranshahr County

South Khorasan Province
 Shamsabad, Birjand, a village in Birjand County
 Shamsabad, Darmian, a village in Darmian County
 Shamsabad, Khusf, a village in Khusf County
 Shamsabad, Tabas, a village in Tabas County

Tehran Province
 Shamsabad, Tehran
 Shamsabad, Eslamshahr, a village in Eslamshahr County
 Shamsabad, Fashapuyeh, a village in Rey County
 Shamsabad, Kahrizak, a village in Rey County
 Shamsabad, Varamin, a village in Varamin County
 Shamsabad-e Arab, a village in Varamin County

Yazd Province
 Shamsabad, Abarkuh, a village in Abarkuh County
 Shamsabad, Ardakan, a village in Ardakan County
 Shamsabad, Saduq, a village in Saduq County
 Shamsabad (31°43′ N 53°39′ E), Taft, a village in Taft County
 Shamsabad (31°49′ N 53°45′ E), Taft, a village in Taft County

Pakistan
 Shamsabad, Pakistan, near Attock